Markward is both a surname and a given name. Notable people with the name include:

 Mary Stalcup Markward (1922–1972), American FBI informant
 Markward von Annweiler (died 1202), regent of the Kingdom of Sicily